Andrei Alexandrescu (born 1969) is a Romanian-American C++ and D language programmer and author. He is particularly known for his pioneering work on policy-based design implemented via template metaprogramming. These ideas are articulated in his book Modern C++ Design and were first implemented in his programming library, Loki. He also implemented the "move constructors" concept in his MOJO library. He contributed to the C/C++ Users Journal under the byline "Generic<Programming>". Alexandrescu worked as a research scientist at Facebook, before departing the company in August 2015 in order to focus on developing the D programming language.

He became an American citizen in August 2014.

Education and career
Alexandrescu received a B.S. degree in Electrical Engineering from Polytechnic University of Bucharest (Universitatea Politehnica din București) in July 1994.

His first article was published in the C/C++ Users Journal in September 1998. He was a program manager for Netzip, Inc. from April 1999 until February 2000. When the company was acquired by RealNetworks, Inc., he served there as a development manager from February 2000 through September 2001.

Alexandrescu earned an M.S. (2003) and a PhD (2009) in computer science from the University of Washington.

More recently, he has been assisting Walter Bright in the development of the D programming language. Alexandrescu released a book titled The D Programming Language in May 2010.

From 2010 to 2014, Alexandrescu, Herb Sutter, and Scott Meyers ran a small annual technical conference called C++ and Beyond.

Contributions

Expected 

Expected is a template class for C++ which is on the C++ Standards track. Alexandrescu proposes Expected<T> as a class for use as a return value which contains either a T or the exception preventing its creation, which is an improvement over use of either return codes or exceptions exclusively.  Expected can be thought of as a restriction of sum (union) types or algebraic datatypes in various languages, e.g., Hope, or the more recent Haskell and Gallina; or of the error handling mechanism of Google's Go, or the Result type in Rust.

He explains the benefits of Expected<T> as:
 Associates errors with computational goals
 Naturally allows multiple exceptions in flight
 Switch between "error handling" and "exception throwing" styles
 Teleportation possible across thread boundaries, across nothrow subsystem boundaries and across time (save now, throw later)
 Collect, group, combine exceptions

Example 

For example, instead of any of the following common function prototypes:

int parseInt(const string&);  // Returns 0 on error and sets errno.

or

int parseInt(const string&);  // Throws invalid_input or overflow

he proposes the following:

Expected<int> parseInt(const string&);  // Returns an expected int: either an int or an exception

Scope guard 

From 2000 onwards, Alexandrescu has advocated and popularized the scope guard idiom. He has introduced it as a language construct in D. It has been implemented by others in many other languages.

Bibliography

References

External links
 Alexandrescu's homepage – Contains links to downloadable Loki libraries for various compilers.
  Interviu MONEY.ro: Facebook face angajări în România, 1 March 2010

Romanian computer scientists
C++ people
Politehnica University of Bucharest alumni
University of Washington alumni
Living people
Scientists from Bucharest
Facebook employees
1969 births
Romanian emigrants to the United States
Programming language designers